Daniel Harper (born 8 December 2000) is a racing driver from Northern Ireland.  He is currently competing as a BMW Motorsport works driver, having graduated from the BMW Junior Team programme, and is an ex Porsche Carrera Cup Great Britain champion.

Career
Starting his racing career aged six, Harper was a multiple champion in both quad bike and karting competition in his early years, before switching to junior rallying and winning three events in the Ireland Junior 1000 Rally Challenge in 2015.

Harper made the transition to circuit racing the following year after winning the Ginetta Junior Scholarship  and with it a fully-funded season in the Ginetta Junior Championship for 2016.

In his maiden campaign with Douglas Motorsport, he took two outright race victories and won the Rookie Cup title. He returned for a second campaign and won seven races on his way to third in the final standings.

Harper then won his second manufacturer scholarship in three years, being named the 2018/19 Porsche GB Junior driver for the Porsche Carrera Cup Great Britain. In his first year, he won two races and posted more pole positions and fastest laps than any other driver.

He went on to enjoy a sensational 2019 campaign. He won the drivers’ title   with more wins (8), podium finishes (13), pole positions (6) and fastest laps (11) than anyone else, and became only the third driver ever in the series to win races on six consecutive weekends.

For 2020/21, Harper was signed by BMW Motorsport to compete as part of their BMW Junior Team. In each season, he contested the Nürburgring Endurance Series and ADAC TOTAL 24 Hours of Nürburgring alongside team-mates Max Hesse and Neil Verhagen.

Starting the 2020 NES season in a BMW M240i, the BMW Junior Team took a maiden class win in only their third race. A step up to a BMW M4 GT4 soon after yielded a class podium in their first race and a fantastic class victory in their first attempt at the ADAC TOTAL 24 Hours of Nürburgring.

For 2021, they moved up to the premier class in a BMW M6 GT3 with the experienced BMW Team RMG. A brilliant season saw them take two overall race wins and four podium finishes to finish as the overall Nürburgring Endurance Series vice-champions.

In 2022, Harper and the BMW Junior Team won a qualifier race ahead of the ADAC TOTAL 24 Hours of Nürburgring and took a podium finish during a two round stint in the Nürburgring Endurance Series with BMW Team RMG. They also contested a debut season in the GT World Challenge Europe Endurance Cup with ROWE Racing, taking a best result of fourth in the 1000 km of Paul Ricard.

In 2023, Harper will compete as a BMW works driver, entering the opening three rounds of the Nürburgring Endurance Series and the ADAC TOTAL 24 Hours of Nürburgring with BMW Team RMG, a full season in the GT World Challenge Europe Endurance Cup with ROWE Racing, and a debut campaign in the British GT Championship with Century Motorsport.

Harper is a full member of the British Racing Drivers' Club. He was previously part of the BRDC SuperStars programme  and Motorsport UK Academy's Team UK programme.

Racing record

Career summary

Complete Porsche Carrera Cup Great Britain results

Complete GT World Challenge Europe Endurance Cup results
{|
|

Awards

References

External links
http://www.harperracing.com/

Porsche Carrera Cup GB drivers
2000 births
Living people
Ginetta Junior Championship drivers
Porsche Supercup drivers
BMW M drivers
Rowe Racing drivers
Nürburgring 24 Hours drivers